This is a list of the main career statistics of former professional tennis player Stefan Edberg.

Grand Slam finals

Singles: 11 finals (6–5)

Doubles: 5 finals (3–2)

Grand Prix / ATP year-end championships finals

Singles: 2 (1–1)

WCT year-end championships finals

Singles: 1 (0–1)

ATP Super 9 finals (since 1990)

Singles: 9 (4–5)

Doubles: 2 finals (1–1)

Note: before the ATP took over running the men's professional tour in 1990 the Grand Prix Tour had a series of events that were precursors to the Masters Series known as the Grand Prix Super Series.

Performance timelines

Singles

1 As part of the ATP Super 9, held in Stockholm from 1990 to 1994, Essen in 1995 and Stuttgart from 1996 onwards.

Doubles

1 As part of the ATP Super 9, held in Stockholm from 1990 to 1994, Essen in 1995 and Stuttgart from 1996 onwards.

Career finals

Singles: 77 (41 titles, 36 runner-ups)

Doubles: 29 (18–11)

Junior career finals

Grand Slam finals

Singles: 4 (4–0)

1 The 1983 Australian Open was held in December.

Head-to-head record
Edberg's record against top 10 ranked players

 Boris Becker 10–25
 Ivan Lendl 14–13
 Michael Chang 12–9
 Mats Wilander 9–11
 Brad Gilbert 15–4
 Goran Ivanišević 9–10
 Jakob Hlasek 15–1
 Michael Stich 6–10
 Miloslav Mečíř 10–5
 Pete Sampras 6–8
 Guy Forget 7–6
 John McEnroe 6–7
 Emilio Sánchez 9–3
 Jimmy Connors 6–6
 Thomas Muster 10-0
 Anders Järryd 9–2
 Aaron Krickstein 7–4
 Jonas Svensson 10–0
 Pat Cash 8–2
 Jim Courier 4–6
 Sergi Bruguera 6–3
 Johan Kriek 6–3
 Petr Korda 4–5
 Andre Agassi 3–6
 Kevin Curren 7–1
 Jimmy Arias 7–0
 Henri Leconte 6–1
 Richard Krajicek 3–4
 Todd Martin 3–4
 Yannick Noah 6–0
 Tim Mayotte 5–1
 Andriy Medvedev 4–2
 Cédric Pioline 4–2
 Andrés Gómez 4–0
 Wayne Ferreira 3–1
 Karel Nováček 3–1
 Patrick Rafter 3–0
 Yevgeny Kafelnikov 1–2
 Joakim Nyström 0–3
 Tim Henman 2–0
 Alberto Mancini 2–0
 Henrik Sundström 1–1
 José Luis Clerc 1–0
 Carlos Moyá 1–0
 Marcelo Ríos 1–0
 Greg Rusedski 1–0
 Eliot Teltscher 1–0
 Jonas Björkman 0–1

Top 10 wins

External links
 
 
 
 

Tennis career statistics